Lincoln Portrait (also known as A Lincoln Portrait) is a classical orchestral work written by the American composer Aaron Copland. The work involves a full orchestra, with particular emphasis on the brass section at climactic moments. The work is narrated with the reading of excerpts of Abraham Lincoln's great documents, including the Gettysburg Address. An orchestra usually invites a prominent person to be the narrator.

History

Conductor Andre Kostelanetz commissioned Copland to write a musical portrait of an "eminent American" for the New York Philharmonic. Copland chose President Abraham Lincoln, and used material from speeches and letters of Lincoln, as well as original folk songs of the period, including "Camptown Races" and "On Springfield Mountain". 
Copland finished Lincoln Portrait in April 1942.

The first performance was by the Cincinnati Symphony Orchestra on 14 May 1942, with William Adams as the narrator. Because of his leftist views Copland was blacklisted and Lincoln Portrait withdrawn from the 1953 inaugural concert for President Eisenhower Aaron Copland#1935 to 1950.

Texts
Together with some descriptive comments on Lincoln ("Abe Lincoln was a quiet and a melancholy man"), the work contains the following excerpts from his speeches:

Fellow citizens, we cannot escape history. We of this congress and this administration will be remembered in spite of ourselves. No personal significance or
insignificance can spare one or another of us. The fiery trial through which we pass will light us down in honor or dishonor to the latest generation. We, even we here, hold the power and bear the responsibility. (Annual Message to Congress [since the twentieth century, State of the Union], December 1, 1862)

The dogmas of the quiet past are inadequate to the stormy present. The occasion is piled high with difficulty and we must rise with the occasion. As our case is new, so we must think anew and act anew. We must disenthrall ourselves and then we shall save our country. (Annual Message to Congress, December 1, 1862)

It is the eternal struggle between two principles, right and wrong, throughout the world. It is the same spirit that says 'you toil and work and earn bread, and I'll eat it.' No matter in what shape it comes, whether from the mouth of a king who seeks to bestride the people of his own nation, and live by the fruit of their labor, or from one race of men as an apology for enslaving another race, it is the same tyrannical principle. (Lincoln–Douglas debates, October 15, 1858)

As I would not be a slave, so I would not be a master. This expresses my idea of democracy. Whatever differs from this, to the extent of the difference, is no democracy. (Unknown, though in Lincoln's Collected Works)

That from these honored dead we take increased devotion to that cause for which they gave the last full measure of devotion. That we here highly resolve that these dead shall not have died in vain. That this nation under God shall have a new birth of freedom and that government of the people, by the people, and for the people shall not perish from the earth. (Gettysburg Address)

Instrumentation
Lincoln Portrait is scored for speaker and an orchestra consisting of the following instruments:

Woodwinds
2 flutes (both doubling piccolos)
2 oboes
1 English horn (optional)
2 clarinets in B
1 bass clarinet
2 bassoons
1 contrabassoon (optional)

Brass
4 horns in F
3 trumpets in B (third optional)
3 trombones
1 tuba

Percussion
timpani
snare drum
cymbals
bass drum
tam-tam
glockenspiel
sleigh bells
xylophone

Keyboards
celesta (optional)

Strings
harp
Violins I, II
Violas
Cellos
Double basses

Notable narrators
Notable narrators of Lincoln Portrait have included:
 Marian Anderson, Philadelphia Orchestra, conducted by Seiji Ozawa and Aaron Copland, both times at Saratoga Performing Arts Center (1966 and 1977)
 Maya Angelou, Cincinnati Symphony Orchestra, conducted by Louis Langrée, 9 September 2014
 Neil Armstrong, Cincinnati Pops Orchestra, conducted by Erich Kunzel, both times at Riverbend Music Center (1984 and 2009)
 Alec Baldwin, Philadelphia Orchestra 2009
 Kingman Brewster Jr. (ambassador, former president of Yale University), Yale Symphony Orchestra, conducted by Rob Kapilow (1978)
 Richard Butler (Governor of Tasmania), Sydney Symphony Orchestra
 President Bill Clinton with the Arkansas Symphony, conducted by David Itkin.  March 2003; recorded March 2003.
 Judy Collins from the album "Portrait of an American Girl" (2005)
 Aaron Copland, National Symphony Orchestra, conducted by Leonard Bernstein. 14 November 1980, 80th birthday concert 
 Peter Coyote, Symphony Napa Valley, 29 March 2015.
 Walter Cronkite, U.S. Air Force Symphony Orchestra
 Charles Dance, Cincinnati Symphony Orchestra, conducted by Louis Langrée, at the Royal Albert Hall for the BBC Proms, London, England, 2017
 Clifton Davis, Jacksonville Symphony, conducted by Fabio Mechetti, at Times-Union Center for the Performing Arts Florida, USA, 2009
 Richard DeVos, Grand Rapids Symphony, conducted by David Lockington. 2000.
 Melvyn Douglas, Boston Symphony Orchestra, conducted by Serge Koussevitzky. Recorded by RCA Victor 7 February 1946. 
 Hugh Downs at the age of 91 with the Phoenix Symphony, conducted by Michael Christie, for the Centennial Celebration of the State of Arizona, February 2012
 Julius Erving, Philadelphia Orchestra, 1991
 Frankie Faison, Montclair State University Orchestra, Spring 2000
 Henry Fonda, London Symphony Orchestra, conducted by Aaron Copland, at Walthamstow London, 1968
 Danny Glover, Appleton West High School Wind Ensemble, Fox Cities PAC, December 2002
 The Reverend Professor Peter J. Gomes, Boston Symphony Orchestra, July 2009
 John Goodman, Louisiana Philharmonic Orchestra, conducted by James Paul, WWII National Museum for Veterans Day Concert; 11 November 2013
 Vice President Al Gore, New York Philharmonic
 Washington State Governor Christine Gregoire, Seattle Philharmonic Orchestra, Adam Stern (conductor)
 Tom Hanks, U.S. Armed Forces Symphony, at the We Are One celebration, 18 January 2009
 Katharine Hepburn, Cincinnati Pops Orchestra conducted by Erich Kunzel (1988 Grammy Award nominee)
 Charlton Heston, Utah Symphony conducted by Maurice Abravanel
 Samuel L. Jackson, Orchestra of St. Luke's conducted by James Levine
 James Earl Jones has performed the piece several times, including with the Seattle Symphony, San Francisco Symphony, and at the Chicago Symphony Orchestra's Lincoln Bicentennial Celebration in February 2009, as well as with the Arkansas Symphony Orchestra (David Itkin, conductor), February 1999.
 Barbara Jordan, Houston Symphony, (Lawrence Foster, conductor)
 Sen. Edward M. Kennedy, Symphony by the Sea, at the Newburyport Yankee Homecoming, 29 July 2006
 Jim Lehrer, U.S. Marine Band, conducted by Jason Fettig, 23 February 2015, Time Capsule 1945: The 70th Anniversary of the End of World War II
 George McGovern, South Dakota Symphony Orchestra, October 2012 in his last public appearance before his death
 Walter Mondale, Minnesota Orchestra
 Robert A. Muh, Boston Symphony Orchestra, Boston Pops, conducted by Keith Lockhart, 4 June 2009
 Bill Schonely, Portland Choir & Orchestra, conducted by Edward Higgins, June 2015
 Paul Newman, St. Louis Symphony
 President Barack Obama, Chicago Symphony Orchestra conducted by William Eddins
 Gregory Peck, Los Angeles Philharmonic, conducted by Zubin Mehta, 9 April 1996
 Vincent Price, Yale Symphony Orchestra, Leif Bjaland conductor 
 Phylicia Rashad, National Symphony Orchestra, conducted by Gianandrea Noseda, Kennedy Center, 22 January 2017 
 Esther Rolle
 Carl Sandburg, New York Philharmonic, conducted by Andre Kostelanetz, 1959.  Sandburg's narration won a Grammy Award in 1960.
 Norman Schwarzkopf, St. Louis Symphony, conducted by Leonard Slatkin
 Barry Scott, Nashville Symphony, Leonard Slatkin, 6 July 2008 (recorded by Naxos Records)
 Tom Skerritt, Seattle Philharmonic Orchestra, Adam Stern (conductor)
 Kenneth Spencer, New York Philharmonic, conducted by Artur Rodziński, February 1946. Recorded on Columbia Masterworks
 Willie Stargell, Pittsburgh Symphony Orchestra, September 2000
 Adlai Stevenson, Philadelphia Orchestra, conducted by Eugene Ormandy (and recorded by Columbia Records)
 Juana Sujo with the Venezuela Symphony Orchestra conducted by Aaron Copland, Caracas, March 28, 1957
 George Takei with the Honolulu Symphony conducted by Samuel Wong, November 2004; also upcoming with the Oregon Symphony conducted by Carlos Kalmar, September 16, 2017
 James Taylor with the Los Angeles Philharmonic, conducted by John Williams
 Margaret Thatcher, London Symphony Orchestra
 Rex Tillerson, Dallas Winds, conducted by Jerry Junkin, 12 November 2019
 Gore Vidal, Los Angeles Philharmonic, conducted by Michael Tilson Thomas, at Hollywood Bowl, 2 August 2007
 William Warfield, several orchestras and conductors. Warfield's narration won a Grammy Award in 1984.
 James Whitmore, Boston Pops, conducted by John Williams, Governor's Island, Statue of Liberty's 100th Celebration, 3 July 1986.
 L. Douglas Wilder, with the Virginia Commonwealth University Wind Ensemble, conducted by Terry Austin
 Frank J. Williams, Rhode Island Philharmonic, February 2009
 Steve Guttenberg, South Shore Symphony, Rockville Centre, NY November 2016, conducted by Scott Jackson Wiley
 Vin Scully, Los Angeles Philharmonic, July 13, 2017 at the Hollywood Bowl
 Justin Vivian Bond, The Orchestra Now conducted by Leon Botstein at Bard College, November 4, 2018

In Venezuela
Juana Sujo, an Argentine actress resident in Venezuela and an opponent of the repressive regime of Venezuelan President Marcos Pérez Jiménez, was credited with sparking the popular uprising that led to his removal from power. Aaron Copland had come to Caracas to conduct the first Venezuelan performance of Lincoln Portrait on March 27, 1957. A New York Times reviewer said it had a "magical impact" on the audience.

As Copland recalled, "To everyone's surprise, the reigning dictator, who had rarely dared to be seen in public, arrived at the last possible moment." On that evening Juana Sujo was the fiery narrator who performed the spoken-word parts of the piece. When she spoke the final words, "... that government of the people, by the people, for the people (el gobierno del pueblo, por el pueblo y para el pueblo) shall not perish from the earth," the audience rose and began cheering and shouting so loudly that Copland could not hear the remainder of the music. Copland continued, "It was not long after that the dictator was deposed and fled from the country. I was later told by an American foreign service officer that the Lincoln Portrait was credited with having inspired the first public demonstration against him. That, in effect, it had started a revolution."

Popular culture

The composition was lampooned by Peter Schickele ("P. D. Q. Bach") in his piece Bach Portrait on the 1989 album 1712 Overture and Other Musical Assaults. Another parody, "A Quayle Portrait" by Jeff Ehrhart, features quotes from former U.S. Vice President Dan Quayle.

Nine minutes of the composition, without narration (from a late 1960s recording by the London Symphony Orchestra), plays during the climactic one-on-one sequence between Jake and Jesus Shuttlesworth (played by Denzel Washington and Ray Allen) in the 1998 Spike Lee film, He Got Game. In the film, Jesus Shuttlesworth is a student at Abraham Lincoln High School in Brooklyn.

See also
 Names from the War

References

External links
 NPR interview and broadcast of Lincoln Portrait—contains the original text for the narration.
 CarlSandburg.net: A Research Website for Sandburg Studies
 , Lincoln Portrait (12:28, incomplete), New York Philharmonic
 Aaron Copland#1935 to 1950

Compositions by Aaron Copland
1942 compositions
Compositions for symphony orchestra
Compositions with a narrator
Abraham Lincoln in art
Recordings by Carl Sandburg
Music and politics
Musical compositions about the American Civil War